Airplane airbags are airbags that are located in the seat belts on some airplanes. They are designed to lessen the impact of crashes with minor injuries. Dependent on an airline's choice of installation, airplane airbags are most often installed in First class, Business class, Premium Economy, and Economy bulkhead/exit row seats. The seat belt-located mechanism can preclude concomitant use with seat belt extenders; i.e., the use of seat belt extenders deactivates the airbag mechanism. As a result, some airlines may require seat belt extender users to be reassigned to seats without airbags. 

Airlines which use airplane airbags include, but are not limited to:

See also
Airbag

References

 Andy Pazstor, "Putting Air Bags In The Air", The Wall Street Journal, November 16, 2006.

Aircraft emergency systems
Airbags